Oussama Mesfar (born March 28, 1989) is an Algerian footballer. He is currently playing as a forward for CA Bordj Bou Arreridj in the Algerian Ligue Professionnelle 1.

International career
On December 22, 2009, Mesfar was called up to the Algerian Under-23 national team by head coach Azzedine Aït Djoudi for a week long training camp. On December 15, 2010, Mesfar scored two goals against Cameroon's Under-23 team in the opening game of the 2010 UNAF U-23 Tournament, as Algeria went on to win the game 6-1.

Won the 2010 UNAF U-23 Tournament with  the Algerian team, and finished top scorer of the competition

References

External links
 
 

1989 births
Living people
Algerian footballers
AS Khroub players
Algerian Ligue Professionnelle 1 players
Algeria under-23 international footballers
CA Bordj Bou Arréridj players
Association football forwards
21st-century Algerian people